The men's 5000 metres event at the 2005 Asian Athletics Championships was held in Incheon, South Korea on September 4.

Results

References
Results

5000
5000 metres at the Asian Athletics Championships